Birkenhead Grange Lane was a railway station in Birkenhead, England. On opening, the station was the northern terminus of the Chester and Birkenhead Railway. The station was opened in 1840, and closed to passengers in 1844 but the site remained in use for goods until the 1970s.

References

Sources
 

Disused railway stations in the Metropolitan Borough of Wirral
Former Birkenhead Railway stations
Disused railway goods stations in Great Britain
Railway stations in Great Britain opened in 1840
Railway stations in Great Britain closed in 1844